Scrobipalpa krasilnikovae is a moth in the family Gelechiidae. It was described by Piskunov in 1990. It is found in Turkmenistan, where it was described from the Danata gorge in the Kjurendag mountain range.

References

Scrobipalpa
Moths described in 1990